ICCL may refer to:

International Committee on Computational Linguistics
International Council of Cruise Lines
Irish Council for Civil Liberties
Short for "I couldn't care less," an idiomatic expression indicating lack of interest.